The Stevenson Professorship of Hispanic Studies is a named chair at the University of Glasgow. It was established as the Stevenson Professorship of Spanish in 1924 and endowed by a donation from Sir Daniel Macaulay Stevenson. Its name was altered to the current form in 1959.

List of professors 
 1925–1932: William James Entwistle, FBA.
 1932–1972: William Christopher Atkinson
 1972–1994: Nicholas Grenville Round
 1995–1999: David Gareth Walters
1999–2013: Vacant

References 

University of Glasgow